Isonipecotic acid is a heterocyclic compound which acts as a GABAA receptor partial agonist.

It consists of a piperidine ring with a carboxylic acid moiety in the iso position (and as such is also known as "4-piperidinecarboxylic acid").

References

4-Piperidinyl compounds
Carboxylic acids
GABAA receptor agonists
GABAA-rho receptor antagonists
Glycine receptor antagonists
Sedatives